Democratization is the process by which political systems become more democratic. It may also refer to:
Waves of democracy
Demokratizatsiya (Soviet Union)
Democratization of energy
Democratization of knowledge
Democratization of technology

See also